Vicki Jensen (born 1965) is a Minnesota politician and former member of the Minnesota Senate. A member of the Minnesota Democratic–Farmer–Labor Party, she represented District 24 in southeastern Minnesota.

Education and early career
Jensen attended South Central Technical College. She served on the Owatonna School Board. She and her husband own an independent insurance agency in Owatonna.

Minnesota Senate
Jensen was first elected to the Minnesota Senate in 2012. She lost re-election to Republican John Jasinski in 2016.

Jensen sought the Democratic nomination for the U.S. House seat for Minnesota's 1st congressional district in the 2018 election, but later dropped out of the race.

Personal life
Jensen is married to Trevor. They have three children and reside in Owatonna, Minnesota.

References

External links

 Vicki Jensen for Congress - campaign website

1965 births
Living people
Democratic Party Minnesota state senators
21st-century American politicians
People from Owatonna, Minnesota